Partition is a film by award-winning director Ken McMullen. The film is set in the turmoil surrounding the transfer of political power in British India from British to Indian hands and the Partition of the Indian subcontinent into the Dominion of Pakistan and the Republic of India in 1947. Made in 1987, the film was released on DVD in 2007. Its screening has been voted Time Out Critics' choice No 1 after 20 years.

Plot 
Lunatics in an asylum see the horror of India's partition with a lucidity that seems to escape the seemingly sane political players directing it on the outside.

Principal Cast
 Saeed Jaffrey
 Zia Mohyeddin
 Bhasker Patel
 Roshan Seth
 Zohra Sehgal
 John Shrapnel
 Tariq Yunus

Principle Crew
 Ken McMullen - Director
 Lynn Horsford - Producer
 Tariq Ali and Ken McMullen - Writers
 Saadat Hassan Manto - Original story
 Nanci Scheiesari - Cinematographer
 Paul Cheetham - Production Designer
Music composed by Barrie Guard

References

External links

Movie Mail review

1987 films
1987 drama films
Films directed by Ken McMullen
British drama films
Films set in the partition of India
1980s British films